Northpark Mall, NorthPark Mall, or North Park Mall may refer to:

 NorthPark Mall (Iowa) in Davenport, Iowa
 Northpark Mall (Mississippi) in Jackson, Mississippi
 Northpark Mall (Missouri) in Joplin, Missouri
 NorthPark Mall (Oklahoma) in Oklahoma City, Oklahoma
 NorthPark Mall (Charlotte, North Carolina) in Charlotte, North Carolina
 North Park Mall, a defunct mall in Villa Park, Illinois
 North Park Mall, a defunct mall in El Paso, Texas
 NorthPark Center in Dallas, Texas

See also
 Five Points Mall in Marion, Indiana, formerly known as North Park Mall